The Ideberg classification is a system of categorizing scapula fractures involving the glenoid fossa.

Classification

References
 Orthobullets

Injuries of shoulder and upper arm
Orthopedic classifications